is a 2018 Japanese romance drama film directed by Ryūsuke Hamaguchi, starring Masahiro Higashide and Erika Karata. It was selected to compete for the Palme d'Or at the 2018 Cannes Film Festival. It is based on a 2010 novel by Tomoka Shibasaki about a woman who falls in love with two men who look the same but act completely differently.

Plot
Asako, a young woman who lives in Osaka, experiences love at first sight when she is confronted by the mysterious Baku. The two start a relationship against the advice from Asako's friend who only believes Baku will hurt her. After spending the night at Baku's place, Asako is awoken to find that he is missing. It's explained that Baku suddenly disappears from time to time and it's been that way since his father died. Baku returns to Asako's avail, and they embrace. Baku tells Asako that he will always return to her. A voice-over explains that Baku suddenly disappears once again, and they lose touch with each other.

Two years later, Asako is living in Tokyo and works at a coffee shop. She encounters a businessman named Ryohei, who works at a nearby Japanese sake company. He is nearly identical to Baku in physical appearance, and Asako believes it is him at first and even verbally greets him with Baku's name. Only after some tentative verbal exchange does Asako accept that it is not Baku but another young man. Ryohei doesn't understand why Asako treats him oddly and with tentativeness. It isn't until one night when he unexpectedly helps her friend get into an art show, that he begins to learn more about Asako.

As they stop for coffee after the show, Asako excuses herself suddenly to depart, and her friend then suggests that he invite one of his friends to come visit for dinner and to bring a blind date for her, so that Ryohei can meet with Asako again. Ryohei is sufficiently taken with Asako that he finds a friend to invite for the dinner and discovers that Asako's friend is currently playing a part in Chekhov's The Sea Gull. Ryohei's friend and Asako's friend seem to quarrel about the best way to act the parts in Chekhov's play, though they eventually stop quarrelling and the four have dinner together. After the evening is over, Ryohei continues to try to win Asako over and eventually succeeds.

Five years later, Asako and Ryohei are living together happily, accompanied by a cat Jintan. Asako learns that Baku has become a famous actor and model. Baku returns and impulsively asks Asako to leave Ryohei in the middle of a dinner their friends are throwing for them to celebrate Asako's engagement to Ryohei. Asako is overwhelmed by the offer and discovers that her feelings to Baku are still unresolved and starkly leaves the table to depart with Baku.

She and Baku travel north together to stay at Baku's parent's home which is currently uninhabited for the season. Asako changes her mind about Baku and decides she was superficial when she accepted Baku's offer to run away from Ryohei. She returns to Ryohei who is dismayed by her returning and tells her to get out. After several hours of walking through the suburbs around Ryohei's apartment, she sees Ryohei who again tells her to leave while he returns to his apartment. She runs after him but is again locked out at the door. As time passes, Ryohei opens the door and hands her his pet cat and leaves the door unlocked to the apartment. Asako tries the doorknob and enters into the apartment when Ryohei tells her that he no longer trusts her. She acknowledges his comment and the two stand next to each other on the porch looking out into the rainy landscape as the film ends.

Cast
 Masahiro Higashide as Ryohei Maruko / Baku Torii
 Erika Karata as Asako Izumiya
 Kōji Seto as Kosuke Kushihashi
 Rio Yamashita as Maya Suzuki
 Sairi Ito as Haruyo Shima
 Daichi Watanabe as Nobuyuki Okazaki
 Kōji Nakamoto as Hirakawa
 Misako Tanaka as Eiko Okazaki

Release

The film was screened at the 2018 Cannes Film Festival in competition on 14 May 2018. It was released in Japan on 1 September 2018, and in the United States by Grasshopper Film.

Critical response
The website's critical consensus reads, "Asako I & IIs high-concept premise is anchored by thought-provoking themes and confident, compelling work from director Ryusuke Hamaguchi." On Metacritic, the film has a weighted average score of 68 out of 100, based on 20 critics, indicating "generally favorable reviews".

Peter Bradshaw of The Guardian called the film "an amusing essay in amorous delusion." Yannick Vely, writing for Paris Match, praised Hamaguchi's sympathetic portrayal of characters but suggested that some plot twists might appear forced to Western viewers. Eric Kohn of IndieWire wrote: "It's refreshing to see a high-concept movie that doesn't assume every love story has to reach a tidy conclusion, and implies that some happy endings are best left open-ended."

Accolades

References

Further reading

External links
  
 

2018 films
2018 romantic drama films
Japanese romantic drama films
2010s Japanese-language films
Films set in Osaka
Films directed by Ryusuke Hamaguchi
2010s Japanese films